"Amour Programmé" is a song by the French Canadian synthpop group Nudimension.
 
The single is in the French language and was recorded at Fountain Studios, Montreal, Quebec, Canada. Released by Illusion Records (Canada) in May 1983, it became a breakthrough single for Nudimension and was the first to feature TV presenter Anne-Marie Cyr on vocals. It achieved moderate success in French-speaking regions of Canada, charting in the top 20 francophone charts and in Europe. It was responsible for a number of Nudimension's early TV performances including Quebec TV’s prime-time Lautrec Show.

It was also released with a music video created by the band's Marc Fontaine, which was unusual for all but the biggest bands in 1983. The video featured footage shot during one of the band's appearances on Montreal's Musi-Video show and scenes of Louie Louie and Cyr in the studio with basic chromakey overlay effects.

In 2009, two versions of the song were featured on the band's remastered album The Best of Nudimension.

Credits
Anne-Marie Cyr - Vocals
Louie Louie - Vocals, Drums, Keyboards
Patrick Bourgeois - Electric Guitar
Francois Laberge - Keyboards
Ben Kaye - Producer

References

External links
Nudimension Article and recent interview (In French)

1983 debut singles
1983 songs
Nudimension songs